Portugal was represented for the second time by Carlos Mendes, with the song "A festa da vida", at the 1972 Eurovision Song Contest, which took place on 25 March in Edinburgh. "A festa da vida" was chosen as the Portuguese entry at the Grande Prémio TV da Canção Portuguesa on 22 February.

Before Eurovision

Festival da Canção 1972
The Grande Prémio TV da Canção Portuguesa 1972 was held at the Teatro São Luiz in Lisbon, hosted by Alice Cruz and Carlos Cruz. Eight songs took part in the final. The results were determined by a new voting system: in addition to the vote of the usual distrital jury, based in the respective 18 district capitals that had 20 votes each, RTP called the selection jury, composed of eight elements, to vote, each one with 10 votes to distribute among the songs in the contest. This year, the Interpretation Prize was established, an award that over the course of several festivals distinguished the best interpretations in the respective festivals; Duarte Mendes for the interpretation of "Cidade alheia" was elected this year.

At Eurovision 
On the night of the final Mendes performed 7th in the running order, following Norway and preceding Switzerland. At the close of the voting the song had received 90 points, coming 7th in the field of 18 competing countries, at the time Portugal's highest Eurovision finish. The orchestra during the Portuguese entry was conducted by Richard Hill. The Portuguese jury members were Pedro Sousa Macedo and Maria João Aguiar.

Voting

References 

1972
Countries in the Eurovision Song Contest 1972
Eurovision